Filip Ristovski (born 3 January 1995) is a Macedonian football defender who plays for German club TuS Mechtersheim.

Club career
Born in Negotino, Ristovski played two and a half seasons with FK Metalurg Skopje in the Macedonian First Football League.

During the winter-brak of the 2015–16 season he moved abroad to Bosnian side FK Borac Banja Luka and played with them the second half of the 2015–16 Premier League of Bosnia and Herzegovina.

As Borac ended relegated, Ristovski decided to move, and after a successful trial period, he signed with Serbian side FK Javor Ivanjica in August 2016. He made his debut for Javor in the 2016–17 Serbian SuperLiga on 25 February 2017 in a 23rd-round game against FK Spartak Subotica in a home 2–3 defeat.

Ristovski joined FK Shkupi in January 2019.

International career
He played for Macedonia U-19 and U-21 national teams.

References

1995 births
Living people
People from Negotino
Association football fullbacks
Macedonian footballers
North Macedonia youth international footballers
North Macedonia under-21 international footballers
FK Metalurg Skopje players
FK Borac Banja Luka players
FK Javor Ivanjica players
FK Sileks players
FK Shkupi players
FK Borec players
TuS Mechtersheim players
Macedonian First Football League players
Premier League of Bosnia and Herzegovina players
Serbian SuperLiga players
Oberliga (football) players
Macedonian expatriate footballers
Expatriate footballers in Bosnia and Herzegovina
Macedonian expatriate sportspeople in Bosnia and Herzegovina
Expatriate footballers in Serbia
Macedonian expatriate sportspeople in Serbia
Expatriate footballers in Germany
Macedonian expatriate sportspeople in Germany